Jingaku Takashi  (born 24 December 1959 as Takashi Nakayama) is a former sumo wrestler from Shibushi, Kagoshima, Japan. He made his professional debut in May 1977, and reached the top division in January 1983. His highest rank was komusubi and he earned two kinboshi. He retired in September 1991.

Career
He came from the same area of Japan as future stable-mates Sakahoko and Terao. He was fond of kendo at school. He joined Izutsu stable in 1977, and first reached a sekitori rank in July 1982 when he was promoted to the juryo division. He first made the top makuuchi division in January 1983 but posted a losing record of 4–11 and so was immediately demoted. He won promotion back to the top division in January 1984, and remained there for virtually all of the rest of his career. In September 1984 he defeated a yokozuna for the first time when he upset Kitanoumi in  one of the latter's final tournaments. He made the sanyaku ranks for the first time in November 1987 when he reached komusubi, but he proved to be out of his depth and scored only two wins against thirteen losses. He made komusubi once more in September 1990 at the age of 30, but again struggled, winning only three bouts. He suffered from stage fright, losing weight during tournaments because of stomach upsets. This affected his performance against top ranked wrestlers – he stumbled out of the dohyo in a match against Hokutoumi in September 1990 with his opponent barely having to touch him. He was restricted by a foot problem as well as digestive illness towards the end of his career. After 46 consecutive tournaments in the top division he was demoted to juryo after scoring only 4-11 at maegashira 15 in the July 1991 tourney, and he pulled out of the following tournament with a knee injury after fighting only one match. This brought to an end his streak of 1036 consecutive matches from sumo entry. He announced his retirement shortly afterwards.

Retirement from sumo
Jingaku was for one year an elder of the Japan Sumo Association under the name Kasugayama Oyakata, but he was only borrowing the elder name from his stable-mate Sakahoko, and when Sakahoko retired in September 1992 Jingaku was unable to acquire stock elsewhere and had to leave the sumo world. He subsequently worked in a fish processing company.

Fighting style
Jingaku was an exponent of tsuppari, a series of rapid thrusts to the opponent's chest, for which his Izutsu stable was famous, and often won by tsuki-dashi or thrust out. He used a migi-yotsu, or left hand outside, right hand inside grip when fighting on his opponent's mawashi or belt, and yori-kiri (force out) was his most common winning kimarite.  He was also known for using tsuri (lifting) techniques, and utchari, the ring edge pivot.

Personal life
Since leaving sumo he has reverted to his birth name, Takashi Nakayama. He is married with two daughters and a son. In his free time he is a keen golfer.

Career record

See also
Glossary of sumo terms
List of past sumo wrestlers
List of komusubi

References

1959 births
Living people
Japanese sumo wrestlers
Sumo people from Kagoshima Prefecture
Komusubi